Oskar Siira Sivertsen (born 15 February 2004) is a Norwegian professional footballer who plays as a forward for Eliteserien club Kristiansund BK.

Club career
A youth academy graduate of Kristiansund, Sivertsen made his professional debut on 22 August 2020 in a 4–1 league win against Sarpsborg 08. He came on as an 89th-minute substitute for Liridon Kalludra and scored his first goal five minutes later.

International career
Sivertsen is a current Norwegian youth national team player.

Career statistics

Club

References

External links
 
 National team profile 

2004 births
Living people
Association football forwards
Norwegian footballers
Norway youth international footballers
Eliteserien players
Kristiansund BK players